Ekti Tarar Khonje is a 2010 Bengali-language film that was directed by Abhik Mukhopadhyay. The film stars Shayan Munshi, Arpita Pal, Rudranil Ghosh, and veteran actor Dhritiman Chatterjee. Dev appeared in a cameo role.

Plot
It deals with a small-town boy, who comes to Calcutta to be a film actor, and gets involved in a modern-day thugee cult.

References

2010s Bengali-language films
Bengali-language Indian films
Films set in Kolkata